Oenosaurus is an extinct genus of sphenodontian reptile from the Late Jurassic (Tithonian) aged Mörnsheim Formation of Germany.

Description 
The genus is known from a partial skull preserved in ventral view.

Diet and lifestyle
It is likely that Oenosaurus led a durophagous lifestyle as indicated by the broad tooth plates. It is unknown if this animal was aquatic or terrestrial.

Phylogeny 
It is currently considered to be a sapheosaur.

References

Jurassic lepidosaurs
Jurassic reptiles of Europe
Prehistoric reptile genera